The 2016 Bordoloi Trophy was the 64th season of the Bordoloi Trophy, which was hosted in the state of Assam. The tournament is also known as the Bharat Ratna Lokapriya Gopinath Bordoloi Trophy and commenced on 18 September and concluded with the final on 30 September 2016. Eight teams will participate in the tournament, with two of the teams being from Nepal and Bangladesh respectively.

Three Star Club from Nepal won the title after defeating East Bengal 2–1 in the final. Defender Bijaya Dhimal was adjudged best player of the tournament while Bimal Magar walked away with the "Man of the Match" in the final. East Bengal’s Dibyendu Sarkar was named the best goal keeper while Kayode Ajayi Martin of Three Star Club and Adeleja of East Bengal received the highest scorer’s trophy.

Teams

Venues

The Nehru Stadium in Guwahati, Assam was announced as the venue for the tournament.

Group stage

Group A

Group B

Knock-out Stage

Semi-finals

Final

References

External links
 "64th Bharat Ratna Lokopriya Gopinath Bordoloi Trophy 2016"

Bordoloi Trophy
2016–17 in Indian football